Instant is a double compact disc by the Dutch experimental post-punk band The Ex. The band recorded the album in conjunction with many guest musicians, notably members of Holland's Instant Composers Pool (ICP) for whom the album is partially named, the other part being that the Dutch term for "free improvisation" literally translates to "instant composition."

Background

The Ex had long collaborated with ICP members and featured those recordings on the double album Joggers and Smoggers and on the box set 6. Instant marked the band's first album of entirely instrumental and improvised music. Instant's 32 tracks feature shifting duos and trios of musicians performing on a wide array of conventional (electric guitars, reeds, brass, etc.) and non-conventional (e.g., toffee-tin bass) instruments. Though the entire album could have fit onto one 70-minute CD, the band formatted it for a briefer listening experience with each of Instants 35-minute discs containing 16 short tracks.

Reception

Dean McFarlane's review for Allmusic is quite positive (in contrast to the middling score), calling it a culmination of the "stridently avant-garde direction" the band had taken "beginning with the Joggers and Smoggers album and explored extensively with cellist Tom Cora -- from the punchy chaotic punk rock of the band's '80s releases to total free improvisation." He writes that the "collection covers a lot of ground, from noisy vignettes in the vein of Fred Frith and Chris Cutler's workouts to subdued passages that recall even atonal avant-garde classical works; AMM and Derek Bailey also spring to mind. Instant is not all free-form, however -- in fact, the forms are held together by vague folk themes and the band's classic angular Captain Beefheart-like arrangements." He concludes by writing that the "two-CD set is certainly substantial in covering the band's multifaceted work, and with a group this unique and with so many compelling approaches that mix folk, punk, free jazz, and ethnic forms in such a singular fashion, there are few other recordings of this nature around." Trouser Press was similarly positive, calling it "[n]icely annotated, bravely executed and totally cool."

Track listingDisc 1 "If the Hat Fits the Suit"
 "Duo Rumpus"
 "Kloptimog Twist"
 "Baars vs. Karekiet"
 "Keng Lil Surf"
 "Duo Triptych Too"
 "Lip Up, Stump"
 "So Low, Solex?"
 "Skoplje Bop"
 "Buildance"
 "Bratunac"
 "Horsemeal"
 "Expoobident"
 "Slow Sleeper
 "Duo Loom"
 "Te-Au-O-Tonga"Disc 2'''
 "Travel On, Poor Bob"
 "What Inflexibility?"
 "Bon-Go Tell You Git-La La"
 "Duo Variola"
 "Meanwhile Back in Ozone Street"
 "Smuiger"
 "Rusticles"
 "Atoll"
 "Exile O'phonics"
 "Danse Maudit"
 "Knit Knack + Zoom"
 "Oh Muted Foghorn"
 "Duo Tonebone + Hitgit"
 "The Turtle the Hare"
 "Karremans' Last Measure"
 "ThereWereSonicBangsInTheSongsISang,ThereWasNothingTicklingNoOne"

Personnel

The Ex
Terrie (guitar)
Luc (bass
Andy (guitar, viola)
Katrin (drums)
Han Buhrs (harmonica, guitar, toffee-tin bass)
G.W. Sok (various)

Various band members also play organ, accordion, samples + tape, djembé-springs, mbira, reed shakers, musical saw, acoustic guitar, double-bass, chairs.

Guest musicians
Ab Baars (saxophones, clarinet)
Wolter Wierbos (trombone)
Han Bennink (drums)
Michael Vatcher (drums, percussion)
Tristan Honsinger (cello), 
Dolf Planteijdt (acoustic guitar)

Notes
 Cogan, Brian. Encyclopedia of Punk Music and Culture. Westport, Conn.: Greenwood Press, 2006. p. 70. .
 Mount, Heather. "Three Looks into The Ex". In Crane, Larry. Tape Op: The Book about Creative Music Recording, Volume 2. Milwaukee: Hal Leonard Corporation, 2010. pp. 230–233.
 Robbins, Ira A., ed. The Trouser Press Guide to '90s Rock: The all-new 5th edition of The Trouser Press Record Guide. New York: Simon & Schuster, 1997. .
 Sok, G.W. A Mix of Bricks & Valentines: Lyrics 1979–2009. New York: PM Press, 2011.
 Temporary Services. Group Work.'' New York: Printed Matter, March 2007.

References

1995 albums
The Ex (band) albums